Pedro Correia De Almeida is an East Timorese football coach. From 2007 to 2008 and on November 21, 2010 in a friendly match against Indonesia, he led the Timor-Leste national football team.

References

External links
Profile at Coachworldranking.com

Year of birth missing (living people)
Living people
East Timorese football managers
Timor-Leste national football team managers
Place of birth missing (living people)